Jarzembowskiops is an extinct genus of ommatid beetle. It is known from one species, J. caseyi described from the Cenomanian aged Burmese amber of Myanmar. It was originally placed as a species of Brochocoleus, but was subsequently considered distinct enough to warrant its placement in its own separate genus. The species is named after Raymond Casey, a British geologist, while the genus is named after Edmund Jarzembowski, a noted British palaeoentomologist.

References 

Burmese amber
Ommatidae
Fossil taxa described in 2020
Prehistoric beetle genera